South African New Zealanders are New Zealanders who were either born in South Africa or are descendants of South African migrants. As at the 2013 New Zealand census, there were 54,279 South African-born people resident in New Zealand, or 1.36% of the country's population, making South Africa the 5th largest source of New Zealand immigrants behind the United Kingdom, China, India, and Australia. While South Africans have migrated to New Zealand since the 19th century, over 90 percent of South Africans in New Zealand today have migrated since the fall of apartheid in the early 1990s. Most South African New Zealanders are of White South African origin.

Notable South African New Zealanders
 Megan Alatini, pop singer, actress and television personality
 Lesley-Anne Brandt, actress
 Leana de Bruin, netball player
 Meryl Cassie, actress and singer
 Irene van Dyk, netball player
 Penny Hulse, local politician, Deputy Mayor of Auckland (2010–2016)
 Precious McKenzie, weightlifter
 Andrew Mehrtens, rugby union player
 James Musa
 Storm Roux, football player
 Karin Burger, netball player and current Silver Ferns
 Faye Smythe, actress
 BJ Watling, NZ wicket-keeper in Test cricket

See also
 South African diaspora
 New Zealand–South Africa relations

References

African New Zealander
 
 
New Zealand